Hadinaru  is a village in the southern state of Karnataka, it is believed to be the origin place of Mysuru Odeyars (Wodeyars), India. It is located in the Nanjangud taluk of Mysore district in Karnataka.

Demographics
 India census, Hadinaru had a population of 6136 with 3113 males and 3023 females.

See also
 Mysore
 Districts of Karnataka

References

External links

Villages in Mysore district